William E. Wells House is a historic home located at Newell, Hancock County, West Virginia.  It was built in 1907 and extensively remodeled in 1934–1935.  It is a three-story Colonial Revival-style dwelling finished in locally quarried rock-faced ashlar.  It features a multiple-pitched slate roof.  Also on the property are two garages (c. 1920), two stone entry portals (1907), and a stone sidewalk, portals, and walls (1907).  William E. Wells was general manager of the Homer Laughlin Pottery Company.

It was listed on the National Register of Historic Places in 2009.

References

Colonial Revival architecture in West Virginia
Houses completed in 1907
Houses in Hancock County, West Virginia
Houses on the National Register of Historic Places in West Virginia
National Register of Historic Places in Hancock County, West Virginia
Stone houses in West Virginia